Muhammad Kamal Azizi bin Mohamad Zabri (born 28 August 1993) is a Malaysian footballer who plays for Kuala Lumpur City as a right-back.

Club career

Terengganu
On 24 November 2017, Kamal signed a contract with Terengganu.

Kuala Lumpur City

Kamal joined Kuala Lumpur City at the start of the 2021 season and was part of the team that won the 2021 Malaysia Cup.

Career statistics

Club

Honours
Terengganu
 Malaysia Cup runner-up: 2018

Kuala Lumpur City
 Malaysia Cup: 2021

References

External links
 

1993 births
Living people
Malaysian footballers
People from Terengganu
Terengganu F.C. II players
Terengganu FC players
Kuala Lumpur City F.C. players
Malaysia Super League players
Malaysian people of Malay descent
Association football fullbacks